Ntilim Ntilim(Dilim Dilim) (Ντίλι Ντίλι) is a Turkish and Cappadocian Greeks folkloric tune (Kaşık Havası).Ntilim Ntilim is a form of the Turkish folk dance Kaşık Havası.The meter is 4/4.Danced by the Greeks of Anatolia- Karamanlides, Cappadocian Greeks, Pontians and others.

Domna Samiou Lyrics

Original form
The original form of the türkü was popular in Cappadocia .

See also
Kaşık Havası
Ballos
Syrtos
Lamba Da Şişesiz Yanmaz Mı

References

Turkish music
Turkish songs
Greek music
Greek songs
Domna Samiou songs
Year of song unknown
Songwriter unknown